Hamadan Garrison ( – Pādegān-e Hamadān) is a military installation and village in Alvandkuh-e Gharbi Rural District, in the Central District of Hamadan County, Hamadan Province, Iran. At the 2006 census, its population was 745, in 174 families.

References 

Populated places in Hamadan County
Military installations of Iran